Minerva is a Norwegian liberal conservative periodical that started publishing in 1924. It was started by members of the Conservative Students' association in Oslo. In , Nils August Andresen is executive editor, Torbjørn Røe Isaksen editor on society, Kristian Meisingset on culture and Fredrik Gierløff on politics. Magnus Thue is Chief executive officer. It receives financial support from Liberal Science Institute, Norwegian Agency for Development Cooperation and the Conservative Party of Norway.

References

Bibliography

External links
 

1924 establishments in Norway
Conservatism in Norway
Conservative magazines
Magazines established in 1924
Norwegian-language magazines
Literary magazines published in Norway
Magazines published in Oslo